Cheng may refer to:

Chinese states
 Chengjia or Cheng (25–36 AD)
 Cheng Han or Cheng (304–338)
 Zheng (state), or Cheng in Wade–Giles

Places
 Chengdu, abbreviated as Cheng
 Cheng County, in Gansu, China
 Cheng Township, in Malacca, Malaysia

People
 Cheng (surname), Chinese surname
 Zheng (surname), Cheng in Wade–Giles and Cantonese
 ChEng, abbreviation for chief engineer

Other uses
 Cheng language, a Mon–Khmer language of southern Laos
 Cheng (musical instrument), an ancient Chinese musical instrument

See also
Zheng (disambiguation), or Cheng in Wade–Giles